Central Catholic High School is a college preparatory school with an academic campus in Lawrence, Massachusetts and an athletic campus in Lawrence, Massachusetts associated with the Marist Brothers of the Schools and the Roman Catholic Archdiocese of Boston and founded in 1935 by Brother Florentius. 

In 2010, Doreen Keller became the school's first woman principal. The president is Chris Sullivan. The school has approximately 1,200 students and 18,000+ alumni. It was originally a boys-only school but has been co-educational since 1996.

History
 1926: Brother Florentius founds Mount Saint Michael Academy in Buffalo, New York
 1932: Brother Florentius is assigned as principal of St. Anne's School in Lawrence, Massachusetts
 1935
 July: Brother Florentius announces that Central Catholic High School was scheduled to open in July, meeting the need of an all-boys school in Lawrence
 September 16: Fifty boys began their first day of classes at Central Catholic at its location on Main Street
 1936–1938: The school outgrows its small campus at the Knights of Columbus building and expands into borrowed spaces at Holy Trinity School, Franklin Street School, and Hampshire Street School. The Hampshire Street site would later grow into the school's current location.
 1938
 May 1: Brother Florentius dies
 July 10: Ground is broken on Auburn Street, near the intersection of Hampshire Street, on a permanent building for the school
 August: Brother Joseph Abel is named principal
 June: The fifty boys who enrolled in school four years previously become the school's first graduating class
 December 11: The completed building is dedicated, complete with eight classrooms, a library, cafeteria, science laboratory, and residential quarters for the fifteen Marist Brothers who taught at the school
 June 1945: The school graduates its 400th student
 1950: Memorial Gymnasium Building is completed with the largest-at-the-time auditorium seating 2500 and gymnasium in the Merrimack Valley, locker rooms, and more classrooms.
 1951: Memorial Gymnasium Building is dedicated to fourteen alumni killed in action during World War II
 1960: The first three lay teachers are hired at the school.
 1969: The Board of Directors are established and initiate a campaign to construct a new building
 1970: The new building, at 300 Hampshire Street, is opened and is still used to this day.
 September 16, 1971: The Hampshire Street building is dedicated
 1972: The Auburn Street building's use is discontinued
 1984: The Auburn Street building is demolished
 1989:  Football team wins its first Merrimack Valley Conference title completing a perfect 10–0 regular season. The team was led by the big-play combination of Boston Globe All-Scholastic quarterback Chris Lane and Boston Herald All-Scholastic receiver Mark Conway.
 Mid '90s: The Memorial Gymnasium Building undergoes extensive renovations.
 September 1996: Upon the closing of its sister school, St. Mary's High School, Central Catholic opens in September as a co-educational institution and admitting young women from St Mary's as well as from throughout the Merrimack Valley.
 December 1997: Football team wins the MIAA Division II Super Bowl by beating Wakefield, MA 34–16 behind captain Joseph Uliano '98 who was The Eagle-Tribune Defensive Player of the Year and named to both the Boston Herald and Boston Globe All-Scholastic Teams.
 December 1998: Football team repeats as MIAA Division II Super Bowl champions with its 29–13 victory over Acton-Boxborough Regional High School (Acton, MA) behind captain and 2-time MIAA Super Bowl champion quarterback Niall Murphy '99.
 March 14, 1999: The Central Catholic Boys Varsity Basket ball Team wins their first MIAA (Massachusetts Interscholastic Athletic Association) Division 1 State Championship, beating Holy Name of Worcester 63–57 in the title game. The team was led by Gatorade Massachusetts Player of the Year, Merrimack Valley Conference MVP, Boston Globe All-Scholastic, and eventual McDonald's All-American Scott Hazelton '00.
 1999: Brother Thomas Long, FMS, who graduated from the school in 1973, is appointed as the first president of the school. David DeFillippo, from the class of 1966, is appointed as the schools first layperson principal.
 2005: A brand new addition is opened which connects the Memorial Gymnasium to the Hampshire street building and includes an additional wing and a new main entrance between the buildings, a new cafeteria, chapel, and state-of-the-art lab and computer facilities
 2006: For the first time in the school's history, 100% of Central Catholic's 272 seniors graduate and go on to higher education.
 March 15, 2008: The Central Catholic Boys Varsity Basketball Team wins the MIAA (Massachusetts Interscholastic Athletic Association) Division 1 State Championship, beating St. John's High School (Shrewsbury, MA) in the title game, and complete the season ranked #17 in the nation by maxpreps.com.
July 2010: Doreen Keller is named the first woman principal at Central Catholic.
November 2010: The girl's varsity soccer team wins their first-ever MIAA Division 1 State Title in the 15-year history of the program. The game was against Shrewsbury at Worcester State College on November 19 where the Raiders took the Colonials down 2–1.
 August 2013: School President Bro. Thomas P. Long, FMS resigns.
 October 2013: Brother Rick Carey is named CCHS President. 
 December 7, 2013:  Football team wins the MIAA Division I State Championship by defeating Xaverian 34–17, behind head coach Chuck Adamopoulos, nicknamed Ground Chuck, captain and All-State running back D'Andre Drummond-Mayrie and wide receiver Cody Demers.
 March 2017: Central Catholic Boys hockey team wins their first three super 8 playoff games by a combined score of 11-1 to make it to their first super 8 championship game against the Arlington Spy Ponders at TD Garden. They eventually lost in overtime 2-1.

Campus

Central Catholic's campus consists of three inter-connected buildings on a small plot of land off Hampshire Street in north Lawrence. The first of which is the oldest remaining part of the Auburn St. school known as the Memorial Gymnasium, known as the "Large Gym" (opened 1950). This building houses classrooms in a hallway known as "the Horseshoe" and the gym, along with a large performance stage as well as a cafe. The second of which is the Hampshire Street building, known as the "Old Building" (opened 1969). 

This three floor building houses the small gymnasium, theatre, administrative offices, computer labs, library, and classrooms. Third, an 80,000 square foot $12.8 Million building, the South Wing is known as the "New Building" (opened 2005). This building houses the new main entrance and lobby, offices of the president and principal, the campus store, additional locker rooms, the campus ministry office, the cafeteria, state-of-the-art science labs, the chapel, and classrooms. The Lawrence campus has a softball field adjacent to the parking lot by Holly Street and a turf field parallel to Auburn Street.

Because of a lack of playing fields at its urban campus, Central Catholic is exploring the possibility of developing a satellite athletic campus to serve its growing athletic program.

Academic departments
 Religious Studies
 English
 Mathematics
 Science
 Social Studies
 World Languages
 Business and Technology
 Visual and Performing Arts
 Health and Physical Education

Graduation awards

The two major awards given at graduation ceremonies every year are the Brother Florentius, FMS Memorial Award, which is the highest honor presented to "the graduate who best exemplifies the ideals and values embodied in the founder of Central Catholic High School" and the Florentian Yearbook Dedication, presented "by the graduating class to the person or persons whom they consider worthy of special praise." 

The Florentius award has been given annually since 1963 and the Florentian Dedication has been given annually since the inception of the yearbook in 1945. Also given at graduation are the Michael Garvey Award which is given to an outstanding male student-athlete and the Mary J. Kilcoyne Award is given to the outstanding female athlete.

Athletics
Central Catholic Raiders are a member of the MIAA and the Merrimack Valley Conference. Up until 1996, the athletic teams were known as the Red Raiders, but the school dropped the word "Red" in 2000. The school offers 29 varsity programs and 51 teams at levels such as varsity, junior varsity, and freshman. Central Catholic has a softball field and open practice field on its Lawrence, MA campus. The Boys Hockey Team practices and plays their home games at Icenter in Salem NH. 

On February 21 2021 the Boys hockey team beat Tewksbury (5-2) to win the (first-ever due to covid-19) MVC Division 1 championship Cup they would finish the season 9-1. The Central Catholic Boys Hockey Team has won the MVC championship 13 times, with the most recent being in 2022, and has qualified for the MIAA Super 8 Tournament 10 times, most recently in 2018.  In 2022, The team qualified for the inaugural reconfigured 32 team state tournament as the no. 17 seed before being defeated 2-1 in the first round by no. 16 Winchester. On February 24, 2007, the Central Catholic Raiders received their first-ever invitation to participate in a play-in game for the Super 8 Hockey Tournament. The team beat Waltham High School in the play-in game and then proceeded to win one game against Malden Catholic High School and lose to both Catholic Memorial School and Weymouth High School respectively in the round-robin bracket round. The football team, track teams, and girls' lacrosse team share the Veterans Memorial Stadium with Lawrence High School. The baseball team has qualified for the MIAA tournament 20 of the past 24 years winning the North Sectional Championship once while runners up two other times. The baseball team has 8 MVC championship crowns, most recently in 2019. 

In 2008 the baseball team won the MIAA prestigious sportsmanship TEAM award as well as the Massachusetts Alliance for Sportsmanship award given by the Boston Red Sox. The boys winning the state championship in 2008. Girls were state champs in 2009. The golf team year in and year out compete for the MVC championship winning 5 back to back titles in recent years as well as in 2009. Wrestling and track perennially contend for MVC, sectional, and state championships. 

The boys recently won the 2009 state championship in outdoor track. The softball team in 2008 won the Division 2 North Sectional Championship and more recently won the MVC Championship in 2010. The Lady Raider soccer program just captured its first MVC crown in ten years in 2008 and repeated in 2009. On March 14 of 2009, the girls won the state championship in girls hoop at the DCU Center in Worcester, MA.  The Boys Outdoor Track team are back-to-back State Champions, in 2009 and 2010.

In 2013, the football team made an improbable run to the Division 1 State Championship, upsetting multiple powerhouse programs throughout the playoffs including Everett, Acton-Boxborough, and Xaverian. They finished the season with a 12–1 record and defeated Xaverian in the Division 1 State Championship by a score of 34–17 at Gillette Stadium in Foxborough Massachusetts. 

The school colors are red & navy blue. Those colors are proudly worn during pep rallies and games as Central Catholic has some of the most dedicated and enthusiastic fans in the nation. The school has had a history of dedicated fans known as the "red sea" who have gone particularly out of their way to show their dedication. "Moses Parting the Red Sea", one of the unique rallying cheers, has gone viral on Facebook since his first appearance in 2010.

Sports teams
 Baseball (boys' varsity, junior varsity, and freshman)
 Basketball (boys' and girls' varsity, junior varsity, and freshman)
 Cheerleading (co-ed varsity and junior varsity)
 Cross Country (boys' and girls' varsity and junior varsity)
 Field Hockey (girl's varsity and junior varsity)
 Football (varsity, junior varsity, sophomore, and freshman)
 Golf (co-ed, varsity)
 Gymnastics (co-ed, varsity)
 Ice hockey (varsity, junior varsity a, and junior varsity b)
 Indoor Track (boys' and girls' varsity and junior varsity)
 Lacrosse (boys' and girls' varsity and junior varsity)
 Outdoor Track (boys' and girls' varsity, junior varsity)
 Soccer (boys' and girls' varsity, junior varsity, and freshman)
 Softball (girls' varsity, junior varsity, and freshman)
 Swimming and Diving (boys' and girls' varsity)
 Tennis (boys' and girls' varsity)
 Volleyball (boys' and girls' varsity and junior varsity and girls' freshman)
 Wrestling (co-ed varsity and junior varsity)

Non-athletic activities and clubs
 Liturgical Band
 Student Newspaper (Raider Review)
 Passport Club
 GUTS (Guys and Girls United to Serve)
 Student Council
 Executive Board – consisting of ass officers from all four grade levels
 Theatre Guild
 Catwalk for Cancer
 Model United Nations
 National Honor Society
 Interact Club
 Drone Club
 Bowling Club
 Yearbook Club
 Technology Club
 Art Club
 Karate Club
 Ski Club
 Cinema Club
 Math League
 Student Alumni Association (SAA) (DErwin)
 Mock Trial Club
 Peer Leadership
 Project Rebuild
 Marist Youth Group
 Fishing Club
 Concert/Pep/Jazz Band
 Spectrum Club
 Robotics Club
 International Dance Club
 Chess Club
 Amnesty International
 Anime Club
 Running Club

Tuition and financial aid
The tuition cost of Central Catholic High School was $15,365 for the 2021/2022 school year. Central Catholic offers a financial aid program. Thirty percent of students receive some form of assistance or scholarship.

Notable alumni 

 Michael M. Gilday, Chief of Naval Operations, United States Navy.
 Jonathan Lemire (1997), journalist and host of MSNBC's Way Too Early

References

Merrimack Valley Conference
Marist Brothers schools
Catholic secondary schools in Massachusetts
Schools in Essex County, Massachusetts
Lawrence, Massachusetts
1935 establishments in Massachusetts
Educational institutions established in 1935